The 2016 Newcastle-under-Lyme Borough Council election took place on 5 May 2016 to elect members of Newcastle-under-Lyme Borough Council in England. This was on the same day as other local elections.

Election result

References

Newcastle-under-Lyme Borough Council election
2016
Newcastle-under-Lyme Borough Council election, 2016